Bring Me Down may refer to:

 "Bring Me Down (You Don't)", a 2011 song by Love Amongst Ruin
 "Bring Me Down", a song by EMF from Cha Cha Cha
 "Bring Me Down", a song by Hafaliadau = Equations, a band that includes Gareth Pierce
 "Bring Me Down", a song by Kanye West from Late Registration
 "Bring Me Down", a song by Lenka from Lenka
 "Bring Me Down", a song by Mehrzad Marashi
 "Bring Me Down", a song by Miranda Lambert from Kerosene, 2005
 "Bring Me Down", a song by Monoxide from Chainsmoker LP
 "Bring Me Down", a song by Nikki Kerkhof
 "Bring Me Down", a song by Nonpoint from Vengeance
 "Bring Me Down", a song by The Open
 "Bring Me Down", a song by Pete Mac from In Limbo
 "Bring Me Down", a song by Pillar from Where Do We Go from Here
 "Bring Me Down", a song by Prime Circle from Live This Life
 "Bring Me Down", a song by Puddle of Mudd from Come Clean
 "Bring Me Down", a song by Rivermaya from Rivermaya
 "Bring Me Down", a song by Roses Are Red from What Became of Me
 "Bring Me Down", a song by Shyne Factory
 "Bring Me Down", a song by Useless ID, included on the compilation album Punk Rock Is Your Friend: Kung Fu Records Sampler No. 4
 "Bring Me Down (Part 2)", a song by Saigon from The Greatest Story Never Told
 "Bring Me Down (Swollen Mix)", a song by Swollen Members from Dagger Mouth
 "Check-moé ben aller (Bring Me Down)", a song by GrimSkunk from EP 2000
 "Faith Healer (Bring Me Down)", a song by Maylene and the Sons of Disaster from IV